Ludmilla Dudarova was a Turkish-born Romanian film actress known for her work in Italy.

Filmography

References

Bibliography 
 Verdone, Luca. I film di Alessandro Blasetti. Gremese Editore, 1989.

External links 
 

Year of death unknown
Year of birth unknown
Romanian people of Turkish descent
Romanian emigrants to Italy
Romanian film actresses
People from Samsun